Royal Air Force Hamworthy or more simply RAF Hamworthy is a former Royal Air Force Coastal Command seaplane base at Poole Harbour in Dorset, England which was operational between 1939 and 1948.  During the Second World War, it was used by the Royal Air Force, the Royal Navy and BOAC.

RAF units and aircraft

References

Citations

Bibliography

External links
 RAF Hamworthy on Dorset Airfields

Royal Air Force stations in Dorset
Seaplane bases in the United Kingdom
Seaplane bases in England
Royal Air Force stations of World War II in the United Kingdom